Retro TV is an American television network. This is a listing of current Retro TV's affiliates, arranged by U.S. state. In most markets, Retro TV operates on a digital subchannel of the main station listed. In some markets, Retro TV is a secondary affiliation, and elsewhere, it operates on an LPTV or Class A station.

See also
List of programs broadcast by Retro Television Network

References

External links

Retro Television Network